Maddy is a surname. Notable people with the surname include:

 Darren Maddy (born 1974), English cricketer
 Joseph E. Maddy (1891–1966), American music educator
 Kenneth L. Maddy (1934–2000), American politician
 Paul Maddy (born 1962), Welsh former footballer
 Penelope Maddy, Professor of Logic and Philosophy of Science and of Mathematics at the University of California, Irvine
 Yulisa Pat Amadu Maddy (1936-2014), Sierra Leonean actor, dancer, director and playwright